Davide Bais (born 2 April 1998) is an Italian racing cyclist, who currently rides for UCI ProTeam . His older brother Mattia is also a professional cyclist.

Major results

2018
 8th Overall Gemenc Grand Prix
 9th Trofeo Città di San Vendemiano
2019
 6th Trofeo Città di San Vendemiano
 9th Overall Turul Romaniei
 9th Trofeo Edil C
 10th Piccolo Giro di Lombardia
 10th Giro del Belvedere
2021
 1st  Mountains classification, Tour du Limousin
2022
 8th Coppa Bernocchi
 8th Giro del Veneto

Grand Tour general classification results timeline

References

External links

1998 births
Living people
Italian male cyclists
People from Rovereto
Cyclists from Trentino-Alto Adige/Südtirol
Sportspeople from Trentino
21st-century Italian people